Tourism in Croatia is a major industry of country's economy, accounting for almost 20% of Croatia's gross domestic product (GDP) as of 2021.

The history of tourism in Croatia dates back to its time as part of Austria-Hungary when wealthy aristocrats would converge to the sea, but had expanded greatly in the 1960s and '70s under the economic policies of the former Yugoslavia. Today, Croatia is one of the most visited tourist destinations in the Mediterranean, with a total of 11.2 million tourists visiting in 2021.

Tourism in Croatia is concentrated in the areas along the Adriatic coast and is strongly seasonal, peaking in July and August. Eight areas in the country have been designated national parks, with an additional eleven as nature parks. Currently, there are ten sites in Croatia on the UNESCO List of World Heritage Sites.

History
Since 2012, the year before Croatia joined the EU, the number of annual tourist arrivals increased by nearly 6 million. Economists argue that Croatia's joining the EU made them a more desirable tourist location due to reinvestment in their economy, more open trade barriers, and lessened customs control.

Only 15% of the coast, the main tourist attraction in Croatia, is urbanized, and plans are in progress to gradually develop Croatia's tourism sector more. The Croatian Tourism Development Strategy has a goal to make Croatia a globally recognized tourist destination for all seasons, and is working towards that goal by building more luxury accommodations, including hotels and tourist services, or renovating older ones. Croatia also has one of the UNWTO's Sustainable Tourism Observatories, part of the organization's International Network of Sustainable Tourism Observatories (INSTO). The observatory is considered a commitment to monitoring and building sustainable tourism.

Tourist regions 
The Croatian National Tourist Board has divided Croatia into six distinct tourist regions.

Istria

The west coast of the peninsula of Istria has several historical towns dating from Roman times, such as the city of Umag, which hosts the yearly Croatia Open ATP tennis tournament on clay courts.

The city of Poreč is known for the UNESCO-protected Euphrasian Basilica, which includes 6th-century mosaics depicting Byzantine art. The city plan still shows the ancient Roman Castrum structure with main streets Decumanus and Cardo Maximus still preserved in their original forms. Marafor is a Roman square with two temples attached. One of them, erected in the 1st century, is dedicated to the Roman god Neptune. Originally a Gothic Franciscan church built in the 13th century, the 'Dieta Istriana' hall was remodeled in the Baroque style in the 18th century.

The region's largest city Pula has one of the best preserved amphitheatres in the world, which is still used for festivals and events. It is surrounded by hotel complexes, resorts, camps, and sports facilities. Nearby is Brijuni national park, formerly the summer residence of late Yugoslav president Josip Broz Tito. Roman villas and temples still lie buried among farm fields and along the shoreline of surrounding fishing and farming villages. The coastal waters offer beaches, fishing, wreck dives to ancient Roman galleys and World War I warships, cliff diving, and sailing. Pula is the end point of the EuroVelo 9 cycle route that runs from Gdańsk on the Baltic Sea through Poland, Czechia, Austria, Slovenia and Croatia.

The town of Rovinj contains well-indented coastal areas with a number of small bays hidden within dense vegetation, open to naturists. Although the beaches are not specified as naturist, naturists frequent them.

The interior is green and wooded, with small stone towns on hills, such as Motovun. The river Mirna flows below the hill. On the other side of the river lies Motovun forest, an area of about 10 square kilometres in the valley of the river Mirna, of which 280 hectares (2.8 km2) is specially protected. This area differs not only from the nearby forests, but also from those of the entire surrounding karst region because of its wildlife, moist soil, and truffles (Tuber magnatum) that grow there. Since 1999, Motovun has hosted the international Motovun Film Festival for independent films from the U.S. and Europe. Grožnjan, another hill town, hosts a three-week jazz festival every July.

Kvarner and Highlands

One of the most varying regions, the entire Kvarner Gulf provides striking scenery, with tall mountains overlooking large islands in the sea. Opatija is the oldest tourist resort in Croatia, its tradition of tourism ranging from the 19th century.

The former Venetian island towns of Rab and Lošinj are popular tourist destinations. The island of Rab is rich in cultural heritage and cultural-historical monuments. Rab is also known as a pioneer of naturism after the visit of Edward VIII and Wallis Simpson. The island offers nature, beaches, heritage, and events such as the Rab arbalest tournament and the Rab Medieval festival – Rapska fjera. With around 2600 hours of sunshine a year, the island of Lošinj is a tourist destination for Slovenians, Italians, and Germans in the summer months.

The interior regions Gorski Kotar, Velebit and Lika have mountain peaks, forests and fields, many animal species including bears, and the national parks of Risnjak and Plitvice Lakes. The Plitvice Lakes National Park lies in the Plitvice plateau which is surrounded by three mountains part of the Dinaric Alps: Plješivica (Gornja Plješevica peak 1,640 m), Mala Kapela (Seliški Vrh peak at 1,280 m), and Medveđak (884 m). The national Park is underlain by karstic rock, mainly dolomite and limestone with associated lakes and caves, this has given rise to the most distinctive feature of its lakes. The lakes are separated by natural dams of travertine, which is deposited by the action of moss, algae, and bacteria. The encrusted plants and bacteria accumulate on top of each other, forming travertine barriers which grow at the rate of about 1 cm per year.

The lakes collectively cover an area of about two square kilometers, with the water exiting from the lowest lake to form the Korana River. The lakes are divided into the 12 Upper Lakes (Gornja jezera) and the four Lower Lakes (Donja jezera): Under the travertine waterfalls Cratoneuron moss sometimes grows, the moss gets encrusted with travertine and fresh moss grows further out, first a crag is formed but later a cave roof forms under the crag. If the water continues flowing the cave becomes progressively bigger. Limestone caves are present as well. The area is also home to an extremely wide variety of animal and bird species. Rare fauna such as the European brown bear, wolf, eagle, owl, lynx, wild cat, and capercaillie can be found there, along with many more common species. At least 126 species of birds have been recorded there, of which 70 have been recorded as breeding.

Dalmatia

Zadar

This region caters to yachting and leisure travel. The Kornati National Park has hundreds of mostly uninhabited islands. Although the island is 25.2 km long, it is no wider than 2.5 km. The park is managed from the town of Murter, on the island of Murter, and is connected to the mainland by a drawbridge.

Zadar, the largest city in the region, gained its urban structure in Roman times; during the time of Julius Caesar and Augustus, the town was fortified and the city walls with towers and gates were built. On the western side of the town were the forum, the basilica and the temple, while outside the town were the amphitheatre and cemeteries. The aqueduct which supplied the town with water is partially preserved. Inside the ancient town, a medieval town had developed with a series of churches and monasteries being built.

The interior has mixed plains and mountains, with the Paklenica canyon as the main attraction. Paklenica National Park is the most visited climbing site in Croatia, and the largest in Southeast Europe. The close proximity of seawater allows tourists to combine climbing, hiking and water sports. There are over 360 equipped and improved routes of various difficulty levels and lengths within Paklenica's climbing sites. The main climbing season begins in spring and ends in late autumn. The Park area contains 150–200 km of trails and paths intended either for tourists or mountaineers. The trails in the Park are marked with boards and mountaineering signs.

The island of Pag has one of the biggest party zones in Europe in the town of Novalja and Zrće. These beaches have all-hours discothèques and beach bars operating during summer months.

Šibenik

This is another yachting region, dotted with islands, and centered on Šibenik and the Cathedral of St James, a UNESCO World Heritage site. Several fortresses, remnants of the Renaissance era (which includes St. Nicholas Fortress) surround the city.

The interior has the Krka National Park with waterfalls and religious monasteries. Skradinski Buk has attractions and facilities available among various footpaths, sightseeing tours and presentations, boat trips, restaurants and a museum. Roški Slap, located near Miljevci, is the second most popular attraction of the Krka National Park in terms of numbers of visitors, and its cascades can be visited throughout the year. Roški Slap may be reached by excursion boat operated by the Krka National Park, although the falls can also be reached with a public road. Inside the park is the island of Visovac which was founded during the reign of Louis I of Hungary, home to the Roman Catholic Visovac Monastery founded by the Franciscans in 1445 near Miljevci village. The island can be visited by a boat tour from Skradinski Buk. The park also includes the Serbian Orthodox Krka monastery founded in 1345. 

The area around the city of Knin has medieval fortresses and archeological remains. The recently discovered Roman town Burnum is 18 km far from Knin in direction of Kistanje, which has the ruins of the biggest amphitheatre in Dalmatia built in 77 AD, which held 8,000 people, during the rule of Vespasian. The nearby villages Biskupija and Kapitul are archaeological sites from the 10th century where remains of medieval Croatian culture are found including churches, graves, decorations, and epigraphs.

Split

The coastal city of Split is also the second largest city in Croatia, and is known for its unique Roman heritage which includes UNESCO-protected Diocletian's Palace. The city was built around the well-preserved palace, which is one of the most complete architectural and cultural features on the Croatian Adriatic coast. The Split Cathedral stems from the palace.

The Makarska Riviera is a stretch of coastline that offers beaches, clubs, cafes, kayaking, sailing, and hiking along the Biokovo range. Makarska, Brela, Omiš, and Baška Voda are the most popular.

The large islands of this region, include the town of Hvar, known for its fishing and tourism industries. Hvar has a mild Mediterranean climate and Mediterranean vegetation. The island promotes itself as "the sunniest spot in Europe", with over 2715 hours of sunlight in an average year. Cultural and artistic events within the Hvar Summer Festival take place throughout the summer, from late June to late September. These events include classical music concerts performed by national and international artists, and performances by amateur groups from Hvar. The Gallery of Modern Art in Hvar is located in the Arsenal building, in the lobby of the historic Theatre of Hvar. The permanent display contains paintings, sculptures, and prints from the collection, and temporary exhibitions are organised within the Museum project Summer of Fine Arts in Hvar.

The Cathedral of St. Stephen and the Bishop's Palace have a Renaissance-baroque style, and a façade with three-cornered gable and a Renaissance Bell Tower in Romanesque style from the 16th century, created by Venetian artists.

Other notable islands in the region include Brač, Čiovo, Šolta, and Vis.

The old city of Trogir is a UNESCO World Heritage Site and contains a mixture of influence from the Hellenistic period, Romans, and Venetians with its Greek architecture, Romanesque churches, Renaissance and Baroque buildings. Trogir is the best-preserved Romanesque-Gothic complex in Central Europe. Trogir's medieval core, surrounded by walls, comprises a preserved castle and tower and a series of dwellings and palaces from the Romanesque, Gothic, Renaissance and Baroque periods. Trogir's grandest building is the Cathedral of St. Lawrence, whose main west portal is a masterpiece by Radovan, and the most significant work of the Romanesque-Gothic style in Croatia. Another notable attraction is the Kamerlengo Castle.

Dubrovnik

One of the best-known Croatian tourist sites is the fortified city of Dubrovnik with its Renaissance culture. The highlight is the Sponza Palace which dates from the 16th century and is currently used to house the National Archives.  The Rector's Palace is a Gothic-Renaissance structure that now houses a museum.  Its façade is depicted on the reverse of the Croatian 50 kuna banknote, issued in 1993 and 2002.

The St. Saviour Church is another remnant of the Renaissance period, next to the Franciscan Monastery. The Franciscan monastery's library possesses 30,000 volumes, 22 incunabula, 1,500 valuable handwritten documents. Exhibits include a 15th-century silver-gilt cross and silver thurible, an 18th-century crucifix from Jerusalem, a martyrology (1541) by Bernardin Gučetić and illuminated Psalters. Dubrovnik's most famous church is St Blaise's Church, built in the 18th century in honor of Dubrovnik's patron saint. Dubrovnik's baroque Cathedral houses relics of Saint Blaise. The city's Dominican Monastery resembles a fortress on the outside but the interior contains an art museum and a Gothic-Romanesque church.  A treasure of the Dominican monastery is its library with over 220 incunabula, numerous illustrated manuscripts, a rich archive with manuscripts and documents and an extensive art collection. The main feature of Dubrovnik is its walls that run 2 km around the city. The walls run from four to six metres thick on the landward side but are thinner on the seaward side. The system of turrets and towers were intended to protect the city.

An excursion along the coast south of Dubrovnik to the area of Ljuta offers daytime cruise excursions with scenic views including water streams, historic water mills and the mountain range east of the coastal plateau.

Just off the coast of Dubrovnik is the forested island of Lokrum. The small island has a castle, a thousand-year-old Benedictine monastery, and a botanical garden initially started by Maximilian I of Mexico in the 19th century. Peacocks and peahens still roam the isle, descended from the original peafowls brought over by Maximilian.

 
The nearby islands include the historical island of Korčula. The Catholic inhabitants of Korčula keep alive old folk church ceremonies and a weapon dance, the Moreška, which dates back to the middle ages. Originally danced only on special occasions, in modern times there are performances twice a week for tourists. The main town's historic sites include the central Romanesque-Gothic Cathedral of St Mark (built from 1301 to 1806), the 15th-century Franciscan monastery with Venetian Gothic cloister, the civic council chambers, the palace of the former Venetian governors, grand 15th and 16th-century palaces of the local merchant nobles, and the city fortifications.

Further along the Adriatic are the forests of Mljet island. Its geological structure consists of limestone and dolomite forming ridges, crests and slopes. A few depressions on the island of Mljet are below sea level and are known as blatine ("mud-lakes") or slatine ("salt-lakes"). During the rain seasons, all blatine are filled with water and turn to brackish during dry seasons.

Central and Northern Croatia 
 
The northern part, with the hilly area of Zagorje and Međimurje, is dotted with castles and spas, and the old city of Varaždin. In Međimurje, there are spas and facilities for recreation in Vučkovec and around Sveti Martin na Muri, both in the northern part of the county and near the Mura. There are also more than 200 clubs for various sporting and recreational activities such as mountaineering, fishing, bowling, CB radio, parachuting and flying small aircraft, including unpowered gliders and powered hang gliders. Hunting also attracts numerous hunters in low game and birds.

In Čakovec Castle, there is a Međimurje County Museum and an art gallery. In the chapel of Sveta Jelena in Šenkovec, and in the Church of St Jerome in Štrigova, there are Baroque frescoes of Ivan Ranger dating between 1776 and 1786. Prelog is home to the beautiful Church of St James, built in 1761.

Varaždin, with its monuments and artistic heritage, represents the best preserved and richest urban complex in continental Croatia. The Varaždin Old Town (fortress) is a medieval defensive building. Construction began in the 14th century, and in the following century the rounded towers, typical of Gothic architecture in Croatia, were added. Varaždin's Cathedral, a former Jesuit church, was built in 1647, has a baroque entrance, 18th-century altar, and paintings. Among festivals, the annual Špancir Fest begins at the end of August (lasts for 10 days). At this time the city welcomes artists, street performers, musicians and vendors for what is called 'the street walking festival'. Varaždin is also the host of the "Radar festival", which hosts concerts at the end of summer. It has already hosted musical stars such as Bob Dylan, Carlos Santana, the Animals, Manic Street Preachers, Solomon Burke among others.

The Marian shrine of Marija Bistrica is the country's largest pilgrimage spot. Hundreds of thousands of pilgrims visit the site every year where the 14th-century church has stood. The church is known for the statue known as Black Madonna with Child, dating to the Ottoman invasion in the 16th century when the statue was hidden in the church and then lost for decades until its discovery. Behind the church is the process of "the Way of the Cross", in which pilgrims begin the trek that leads to Calvary Hill. Pope John Paul II visited the site in 1998 in his second tour of Croatia.

Central Croatia has some natural highlights, such as the Lonjsko Polje Nature Park. The southwest area is known for its forests and wilderness. Baroque churches are found throughout the area, along with other cultural architecture.

Slavonia
Tourism in this region is just developing, mostly with spas. The area of Baranja has the Kopački Rit National Park, a large swamp with a variety of fauna and birds. It is one of the largest and most attractive preserved intact wetlands in Europe, hosting about 260 various bird species such as wild geese and ducks, great white egret, white stork, black stork, white-tailed eagle, crows, Eurasian coot, gulls, terns, common kingfisher, and European green woodpecker. Guided tourist visits by panoramic ships, boats, team of horses or on foot are available, with some packages offering the possibility of photographing or video-recording animals and birds.

The cultural center is the historical city of Osijek, with its baroque style buildings, such as the Church of St. Peter and Paul, a neo-Gothic structure with the second highest tower in Croatia after the Zagreb Cathedral.

The Cathedral of St. Peter and Paul in Đakovo is the town of Đakovo's primary landmark and sacral object throughout the region of Slavonia.

There are three major yearly events celebrating folklore in Slavonia and Baranja: Đakovački vezovi, Vinkovačke jeseni and Brodsko kolo. They present traditional folk costumes, folklore dancing and singing groups, customs, with a parade of horses and wedding wagons. During the Đakovački vezovi, the Đakovo Cathedral hosts choirs, opera artists, and art exhibitions are organized in the exhibition salon, and during the sports program, pure-bred white Lipizzan horses can be seen on the racecourse. Ilok and the war-torn city of Vukovar are also points of interest in the area.

Zagreb
 
Like Prague or Budapest, Zagreb has a Central European feel to it, with a large and well-preserved old town on the hill and a 19th-century city center. The Croatian capital is also the country's largest cultural center, with many museums and galleries.

The historical part of the city to the north of Ban Jelačić Square is composed of the Gornji Grad and Kaptol, a medieval urban complex of churches, palaces, museums, galleries and government buildings that are popular with tourists on sightseeing tours. The historic district can be reached on foot, starting from Jelačić Square, the center of Zagreb, or by a funicular on nearby Tomićeva Street.

Around thirty collections in museums and galleries comprise more than 3.6 million various exhibits, excluding church and private collections. The Archaeological Museum consists of nearly 400,000 varied artifacts and monuments, have been gathered over the years from many different sources. The most famous are the Egyptian collection, the Zagreb mummy and bandages with the oldest Etruscan inscription in the world (Liber Linteus Zagrabiensis), as well as the numismatic collection. The Croatian Natural History Museum holds one of the world's most important collection of Neanderthal remains found at one site. These are the remains, stone weapons and tools of prehistoric "Krapina man". The holdings of the Croatian Natural History Museum comprise more than 250,000 specimens distributed among various different collections.

There are about 20 permanent or seasonal theaters and stages. The Croatian National Theater in Zagreb was built in 1895 and opened by Franz Joseph I of Austria. The most renowned concert hall is the Vatroslav Lisinski Concert Hall, named after the composer of the first Croatian opera and built in 1973. Animafest, the World Festival of Animated Films, takes place every even-numbered year, and the Music Bienniale, the international festival of avant-garde music, every odd-numbered year. It also hosts the annual ZagrebDox documentary film festival. The Festival of the Zagreb Philharmonic and the flowers exhibition Floraart (end of May or beginning of June), the Old-timer Rally annual events. In the summer, theater performances and concerts, mostly in the Upper Town, are organized either indoors or outdoors. The stage on Opatovina hosts the Zagreb Histrionic Summer theater events. Zagreb is also the host of Zagrebfest, the oldest Croatian pop-music festival, as well as of several traditional international sports events and tournaments. The Day of the City of Zagreb on 16 November is celebrated every year with special festivities, especially on the Jarun Lake near the southwestern part of the city.

Primary attractions

North Croatia 

 Trakošćan Castle is a castle built in the 13th century atop a hill in Trakošćan. Also known for exhibiting historic furniture, weapons, and paintings.

Central Croatia 

 Plitvice Lakes National Park is a forest reserve known for its terraced lakes connected by waterfalls.

South Croatia 

 Paklenica is a national park in Starigrad featuring the karst river canyon, known for climbing and water sports.
 Walls of Dubrovnik are defensive historic walls lining the city of Dubrovnik, famous for its views.
 St. Blaise's Church is a Baroque church in Dubrovnik dedicated to the patron saint of Dubrovnik.

Secondary attractions

North Croatia 

 St Mark's Church is a 13th-century styled church in Zagreb known for its medieval architecture.
 Museum of Broken Relationships is an exhibit located in a baroque palace in Zagreb showcasing objects of former couples and sharing their stories.
 Mimara Museum is an art museum in Zagreb once known for holding many masterpieces but now suspected of being largely fakes.
 Croatian Museum of Naïve Art is an art museum in Zagreb showcasing pieces in the naïve art style.

Central Croatia 

 Pula Arena is a Roman amphitheatre in the city of Pula known for being one of the most well preserved Roman amphitheatres.
 Euphrasian Basilica is a cathedral in Poreč combining classical and Byzantine features in a complex structure that retains is atrium, baptistery, and episcopal palace.

South Croatia 

 Krka National Park is a national park along the Krka River known for its travertine waterfalls.
 Ivan Meštrović Gallery is an art museum in Split showcasing the work of Ivan Meštrović.
 Diocletian's Palace is a ruin from Roman emperor Diocletian located in the city of Split. The remains of the palace and its grounds make up the old town of Split today, housing shops, restaurants, and streets.
 Cathedral of Saint Domnius is a Catholic cathedral in Split built from a Roman mausoleum and with a bell tower. It is the current seat of the Archdiocese of Split-Makarska.
 Lovrijenac is a 16th-century fortress and theater along the Walls of Dubrovnik.
 Rector's Palace is a palace built in the Gothic style in Dubrovnik. It also has Renaissance and Baroque elements.
 War Photo Limited is a gallery in Dubrovnik dedicated to pictures depicting war and conflict taken by renowned photojournalists.
 Dubrovnik Cathedral is a Catholic cathedral. It is the seat of the Diocese of Dubrovnik.
 Dominican Monastery is a religious complex, Gothic style church, and museum founded in 1225 in Dubrovnik.
 Trsteno Arboretum is a 15th-century arboretum in Trsteno featuring several exotic plants.
 Zlatni Rat is a spit of land near the city of Bol known as a top European beach destination.
 Blue Grotto is a water logged sea cave known as a show cave for its glowing blue light that appears at certain day times.
 Telašćica is a nature park on the Dugi Otok island known for wildlife.
 Church of St Donatus is a church in Zadar constructed in the 9th century known for its Byzantine architecture.
 Šibenik Cathedral is a Catholic cathedral in Šibenik known for its Renaissance architecture.

UNESCO World Heritage Sites
The United Nations Educational, Scientific and Cultural Organization (UNESCO) has included the following Croatian sites on its World Heritage List:

Tourism statistics

Arrivals by country

Most visitors arriving to Croatia on short term basis were from the following countries of nationality:

See also

 List of museums in Croatia
 Protected areas of Croatia
 List of World Heritage Sites in Croatia
 Industry of Croatia

References

 
Croatia